The Laurence Olivier Award for Best New Musical is an annual award presented by the Society of London Theatre in recognition of achievements in commercial London theatre. The awards were established as the Society of West End Theatre Awards in 1976, and renamed in 1984 in honour of English actor and director Laurence Olivier.

Winners and nominees

1970s

1980s

1990s

2000s

2010s

2020s

Multiple awards and nominations for Best New Musical

Awards

Five awards 

 Stephen Sondheim

Three awards 

 Andrew Lloyd Webber

Two awards 

 Thomas Meehan
 Tim Minchin
 Trevor Nunn
 Hugh Wheeler

See also 
 Critics' Circle Theatre Award for Best Musical
 Drama Desk Award for Outstanding Musical
 Evening Standard Theatre Award for Best Musical
 Tony Award for Best Musical

References

External links
 

Musical